Jimmy Connors was the defending champion but did not compete that year.

Yannick Noah won in the final 3–6, 6–2, 7–5 against Ivan Lendl.

Seeds

Draw

Finals

Top half

Section 1

Section 2

Bottom half

Section 3

Section 4

References

External links
 1982 Congoleum Classic Men's Singles draw

Congoleum Classic - Singles